Weg means way in several Germanic languages. 

Weg or WEG may refer to:

People
 Ruth B. Weg (1920–2002), American gerontologist
 William Ellis Green (1923–2008), Australian cartoonist
 William Ewart Gladstone (1809–1898), British prime minister

Places
 Weg naar Zee, a resort area in Suriname, South America

Media
 Weg!, travel magazine
 Der Weg, political magazine in Argentine
 Neuer Weg, Romanian daily newspaper
 Neuer Weg, East German political magazine
 West End Girls, song by Pet Shop Boys

Organizations
 WEG Industries, the largest Latin American electric motor manufacturer
 West End Games, publisher of roleplaying games
 West End Gang, an organized crime group in Canada
 Württembergische Eisenbahn-Gesellschaft, a railway company in Germany

Sports
 FEI World Equestrian Games
 Woodbine Entertainment Group, horse racing operator located in Canada
 World e-Sports Games, a major league of e-sports

Other
 Water Equivalent to a Global layer, a measure of a theoretical water height on a terrestrial planet, if all water ice would become liquid
 World Education Games, a global online competition focused on mathematics, science and literacy
 Wright Eclipse Gemini, a double decker bus body built by Wrightbus since 2001

See also
Wege (disambiguation)